was a railway station located in Chiebun (智恵文), Nayoro, Hokkaidō. It is operated by the Hokkaido Railway Company. The Station Closed on March 13, 2021.

Lines Serviced
Hokkaido Railway Company
Sōya Main Line

Adjacent stations

References

External links
Ekikara Time Table - JR Hokusei Station

Railway stations in Hokkaido Prefecture
Railway stations in Japan opened in 1959
Railway stations closed in 2021